Tennis at the 2013 Islamic Solidarity Games is held in Jaka Baring Tennis Court, Palembang, Indonesia from 24 September to 29 September 2013.

Medalists

Men

Women

Medal table

References

Results

External links
Official website
2013 South Sumatera

2013 Islamic Solidarity Games
Islamic Solidarity Games
Tennis tournaments in Indonesia
2013